The Deluge is a 1974 Polish historical drama film directed by Jerzy Hoffman, based on the 1886 novel of the same name by Henryk Sienkiewicz. It was nominated for the Academy Award for Best Foreign Language Film at the 47th Academy Awards, but lost to Amarcord. It is the third-most popular film in the history of Polish cinema, with more than 27.6 million tickets sold in its native country by 1987, and 30.5 million sold in the Soviet Union.

Plot
The film is set in the 17th century during the Swedish invasion of the Polish–Lithuanian Commonwealth in the years 1655 to 1658, known as The Deluge, which was eventually thwarted by Polish-Lithuanian forces. However, a quarter of the Polish-Lithuanian population died from the war and plague, and the country's economy was devastated.

Versions
The original film was digitally restored and shown on Polish TV in December, 2013. For its 40th anniversary, a new cut, Potop Redivivus, two hours shorter than the original, was released in the fall of 2014.

Cast

See also
 With Fire and Sword
 Colonel Wolodyjowski
 List of longest films
 List of submissions to the 47th Academy Awards for Best Foreign Language Film
 List of Polish submissions for the Academy Award for Best Foreign Language Film

References

External links

Potop Redivivus: How Jerzy Hoffman Adapted Henryk Sienkiewicz’s Trilogy for the Screen

1974 films
1974 multilingual films
1970s historical drama films
Polish historical drama films
Soviet historical drama films
1970s Polish-language films
Films based on Polish novels
Films based on works by Henryk Sienkiewicz
Films directed by Jerzy Hoffman
Films set in Poland
Films set in the 1650s
Polish multilingual films
Soviet multilingual films
Polish epic films